Municipal election for Pokhara took place on 13 May 2022, with all 167 positions up for election across 33 wards. The electorate elected a mayor, a deputy mayor, 33 ward chairs and 132 ward members. An indirect election will also be held to elect five female members and an additional three female members from the Dalit and minority community to the municipal executive.

Dhanraj Acharya of CPN (Unified Socialist) was elected mayor of Pokhara Metropolitan city.

Background 

Pokhara was established in 1962 as a municipality. The metropolitan city was created in 2017 by incorporating neighboring village development committees and Lekhnath municipality into Pokhara sub-metropolitan city. Electors in each ward elect a ward chair and four ward members, out of which two must be female and one of the two must belong to the Dalit community.

In the previous election, Man Bahadur GC from CPN (Unified Marxist–Leninist) was elected as the first mayor of the metropolitan city.

Mayor and deputy mayor candidates

Surveys and opinion polls

Exit polls

Mayoral results

Ward results 

|-
! colspan="2" style="text-align:centre;" | Party
! Chairman
! Members
|-
| style="background-color:;" |
| style="text-align:left;" |Nepali Congress
| style="text-align:center;" | 23
| style="text-align:center;" | 56
|-
| style="background-color:;" |
| style="text-align:left;" |CPN (Unified Marxist–Leninist)
| style="text-align:center;" | 9
| style="text-align:center;" | 76
|-
| style="background-color:;" |
| style="text-align:left;" |Independent
| style="text-align:center;" | 1
| style="text-align:center;" | 0
|-
! colspan="2" style="text-align:right;" | Total
! 33
! 132
|}

Summary of results by ward

Results for municipal executive election 
The municipal executive consists of the mayor, who is also the chair of the municipal executive, the deputy mayor and ward chairs from each ward. The members of the municipal assembly will elect five female members and three members from the Dalit and minority community to the municipal executive using single non-transferable vote.

Municipal Assembly composition

Results

Municipal Executive composition

See also 

 2022 Nepalese local elections
 2022 Lalitpur municipal election
 2022 Kathmandu municipal election
 2022 Janakpur municipal election
 2022 Bharatpur municipal election

References 

Pokhara